James Alexander Ferguson is a former Australian diplomat, senior public servant and sport administrator. He was Executive Director of the Australian Sports Commission between 1990 and 2000.

Personal
He was born in Sydney. Whilst competing his studies at the University of Sydney, he did a variety of jobs including jackaroo, taxi driver and publisher's editor.  His grandfather was  Sir John Alexander Ferguson (1881-1969), a notable Australian judge and bibliographer. Sir John's collection of Australiana was given to the National Library of Australia and is housed in the Ferguson Room.

Australian Public Service

He worked for the Department of Foreign Affairs between 1966 and 1986. During this period, he was posted overseas several times and held the position of Ambassador to Peru between 1981 and 1983. From 1986 to 1990, he was Head of the Tourism and Sport Division, Commonwealth Department of Arts, Sport, the Environment and Tourism. From 1990 to 2000, he was Executive Director of the Australian Sports Commission (ASC).

Sport
Whilst working in the Australian Government Department of the Arts, Sport, the Environment, Tourism and Territories, he played a role in the establishment of the new Australian Sports Commission as the government authority responsible for all sports development in Australia. He became Executive Director of the Australian Sports Commission in 1990 replacing Ron Harvey. He took over the ASC at a time when it had just completed the merger between the ASC and the Australian Institute of Sport and the Senate Inquiry into Drugs in Sport. In 1993, Australia won the right to host the 2000 Sydney Olympics and Paralympics. This resulted in the Australian Government announcing the Olympic Athlete Program (OAP) in 1994. He was responsible for implementing this six-year program which lead to major changes in Australia's elite sport system.  The OAP program resulted in Australia from progressing from 27 medals at the 1992 Barcelona Olympics to a record 58 medals and fourth place on the medal tally at the Sydney Olympics.  He left the Australian Sports Commission at the end of 2000 and was replaced by Mark Peters. On his departure from the ASC, Peter Bartels, ASC chairman stated "Jim’s contribution to the development of sport in Australia is immeasurable. The level of excellence now reached and the international standing of Australian sport is the best testament to Jim’s time at the ASC". In December 2000, he was awarded the Australian Sports Medal for leadership of the Australian Sports Commission and Australian sport. In 2007, he published the book More than Sunshine & Vegemite : Success the Australian Way which documented the development of Australian sport for the period 1990 to 2000. 
After leaving the Australian Sports Commission, he has been a President of the ACT Rugby Union and China Australia Sports Association. He has been a board member of the Australian Tourist Commission, Great Barrier Reef Marine Park Authority, World Youth Soccer Cup, World Masters Games. He was a member of the Migration Review Tribunal. In 2010, he became a board member of Boxing Australia and was commissioned by Prime Minister Kevin Rudd to develop a plan to assist the Pacific Region through rugby union.

References

University of Sydney alumni
Australian sports executives and administrators
Living people
Year of birth missing (living people)
Recipients of the Australian Sports Medal
Ambassadors of Australia to Peru
Ambassadors of Australia to Colombia
People from Sydney